The solid lines show parent-to-child lineage and dashed lines indicate a questionable blood relationship or adopted siblings. Official monarchs have their names in bold to distinguish them from pretenders or rival claimants.

See also 
 Detailed Arsacids Family tree (French Wikipedia)
 List of rulers of Parthian sub-kingdoms

References
 Genealogy of Parthian Rulers-2010-06-23
 Genealogy of the First Arsacids by G. A. Koshelenko-2010-06-23

Arsacid dynasty
Dynasty genealogy